Osia Lewis (December 3, 1962May 31, 2020) was an American professional arena football player who played four seasons in the Arena Football League with the Chicago Bruisers and Albany Firebirds. He played college football at Oregon State University and attended Tucson High School in Tucson, Arizona.

College career
Lewis was a four-year letterman for the Oregon State Beavers from 1982 to 1985. He primarily played linebacker but also saw time at quarterback, safety and wide receiver for the Beavers. As a senior in 1985, he was named the team's Most Inspirational Player, served as team captain and earned All-Pac-10 and honorable mention All-America honors by the Associated Press. Lewis set school records for single-season defensive points, season fumble recoveries with four and career fumble recoveries with eight.

Professional career
Lewis played for the Chicago Bruisers from 1987 to 1989, earning Second Team All-Arena honors in 1988. He played for the Albany Firebirds in 1990.

Coaching career
Lewis was an assistant coach for the Western Oregon Wolves of Western Oregon State College from 1989 to 1990. He served as an assistant coach for the Oregon State Beavers of Oregon State University, working with linebackers and special teams from 1991 to 1996. He was defensive line coach for the Illinois Fighting Illini of the University of Illinois at Urbana–Champaign from 1997 to 2000 before serving as linebackers coach from 2001 to 2002. Lewis was defensive coordinator of the New Mexico Lobos of the University of New Mexico from 2003 to 2007 while also serving stints as defensive line and linebacker coach. He served as defensive coordinator of the UTEP Miners of the University of Texas at El Paso from 2008 to 2009. He was defensive coordinator of the Hartford Colonials of the United Football League in 2010. Lewis served as defensive line coach of the San Diego State Aztecs of San Diego State University from 2011 to 2015. In February 2016, he joined the Vanderbilt Commodores of Vanderbilt University as a senior defensive assistant and outside linebackers coach.

Death
Lewis died May 31, 2020, from liver cancer. He was 57 years old.

References

External links
Just Sports Stats

1962 births
2020 deaths
American football fullbacks
American football linebackers
African-American players of American football
Oregon State Beavers football players
Chicago Bruisers players
Albany Firebirds players
Western Oregon Wolves football coaches
Oregon State Beavers football coaches
Illinois Fighting Illini football coaches
New Mexico Lobos football coaches
UTEP Miners football coaches
Hartford Colonials coaches
San Diego State Aztecs football coaches
Vanderbilt Commodores football coaches
Players of American football from Anchorage, Alaska
Players of American football from Tucson, Arizona
Tucson High School alumni
Deaths from liver cancer
21st-century African-American people